Paul Alexandre Delair (24 October 1842 – 19 January 1894) was a 19th-century French playwright, poet, chansonnier and novelist.

An administrator at the Académie des Beaux-Arts, he took an active part to the organization of the Exposition universelle of 1889. His plays were presented on the most important Parisian stages of the 19th-century, including the Théâtre du Vaudeville and the Comédie-Française.

Works 

1868: La Découverte, ode sur la navigation
1870: Les Nuits et les réveils
1872: L’Éloge d'Alexandre Dumas
1872: La Voix d'en haut, one-act à-propos dramatique, in verse
1879: La Louve d'Alençon, historical novel
1880: Théâtre de campagne
1880: Garin, five-act drama, in verse
1881: Le Fils de Corneille, à propos in verse
1882: Le Fils du charpentier, tale in verse
1883: Les Rois en exil, 5-acts play, in 7 tableaux, with Alphonse Daudet
1884: Le Centenaire de Figaro, à-propos in verse
1884: Les Contes d'à présent avec une lettre de Coquelin aîné sur la poésie dite en public et l'art de la dire
1885: Apothéose, one-act play in verse
1885: Louchon
1887: Délivrance, cantata, music by Théodore Dubois
1887: Rabelais à Molière, verse
1891: Hélène, drama in 4 acts, incidental music by André Messager
1891: La Mégère apprivoisée, four-act comédie lyrique
1891: L’Âme des fleurs !, poetry, incidental music by Jules Massenet
1893: La Vie chimérique, poems
1894: Chanson d'automne, music by André Messager
1895: Testament poétique, poésies posthumes, with Sully Prudhomme
1897: Chansons épiques (Geste de Guillaume)
1898: Chanson d'hiver !, music by C. de Grandval
1898: Parfums des tilleuls !, poetry, music by Clémence de Grandval
1899: Théâtre inédit
1899: Ma belle m'a dit, poetry, music by Charles Cuvillier
1903: Illusion !, lamento, music by Flégier
1905: Musique d'antan, music by Cuvillier
1908: L'Ile des fleurs !, melody, singing and piano, music by Ange Flégier

Bibliography 
 Ferdinand-Camille Dreyfus, André Berthelot, La Grande encyclopédie, vol.13, 1886, (p. 1161)
 Gérard Walch, Anthologie des poètes français contemporains, 1916, (p. 53)
 Robert Sabatier, Histoire de la poésie française du XIXe, vol.2, 1977, (p. 82)
 Jacques Delair, Paul Delair (1842-1894), undated

1842 births
1894 deaths
People from Montereau-Fault-Yonne
French chansonniers
19th-century French novelists
19th-century French dramatists and playwrights
19th-century French poets
Chevaliers of the Légion d'honneur